The ECO Cup 1993 was the last edition of the ECO Cup tournament, held in Tehran, Iran in 1993.

Participants

The participants were:

 Kazakhstan U21

Venues

Group stage
Group 1

Group 2

Semi finals

Final

Top scorers
3 Goals
 Samad Marfavi
2 Goals
 Ali Asghar Modir Roosta
 Vidadi Rzayev
 Kanatbek Ishenbaev
 Gurban Gurbanov
 Serik Zheilitbayev

Squads

Iran

Head coach:  Ali Parvin

Turkmenistan

Head coach:  Bayram Durdiyev

Pakistan

Azerbaijan

Head coach:  Alakbar Mammadov

Tajikistan

Head coach:  Sharif Nazarov

Kyrgyzstan

Head coach:  Meklis Koshaliev

Kazakhstan U21

Head coach:  Bauyrzhan Baimukhammedov

References
RSSSF Page on ECO Cup tournament
TeamMelli.com page for squad list
RSSSF page for CIS Club Squads
Tajikistan International Matches
NationalFootballTeams

1993
1993
ECO
1992–93 in Iranian football
1993 in Kazakhstani football
1992–93 in Azerbaijani football
1993 in Tajikistani football
1993 in Pakistani sport